Colin Scott may refer to:

 Colin Scott (footballer) (born 1970), Scottish goalkeeper
 Colin Scott (rugby league) (born 1960), Australian rugby league footballer
 Colin Scott (cricketer) (1919–1992), English cricketer
 Colin Scott (bishop) (born 1933), Bishop of Hulme

See also
 Colin Scot (1941–1999), British singer-songwriter